The Great Northern Railway (GNR) Class N1 was an 0-6-2T side tank steam locomotive designed by Henry Ivatt and introduced in 1906.  They were all withdrawn from service between 1947 and 1959. None have survived.

Most of the class were fitted with condensing apparatus and worked in the London area, from King's Cross and Hornsey depots, on empty coach trains, and on cross-London exchange freight trains.

In 1914, Crewe Works built an armoured train which used a Class N1 engine. The engine was covered by a 14mm steel plate, and featured observation apertures to the front and side, closed by sliding steel shutters. Two of the Ivatt tank engines No. 1587 and No. 1590 were loaned to Crewe to be fitted with armor plating and were named HMT Norna and HMT Alice respectively. They were sold back to the LNER in 1923 and had their armor plating removed.

References 

Ian Allan ABC of British Railways Locomotives, 1948 edition, part 4, page 53.

External links
 LNER Encyclopedia

N1
0-6-2T locomotives
Railway locomotives introduced in 1906
Condensing steam locomotives
Scrapped locomotives
Standard gauge steam locomotives of Great Britain

Passenger locomotives